Abbas Aghaei (born September 2, 1977, in Sarab, East Azerbaijan) is a retired Iranian football player. He played for Tractor, Pas Tehran, Sepahan and Persepolis in the Iran Pro League.

Club career
He spent most of his career at Pas Tehran. In 2004, he joined another IPL club, Sepahan, but returned to Pas after two seasons. In July 2007 Aghaei signed a one-year contract with Iranian giants Persepolis F.C., despite numerous offers from the UAE League from clubs such Al-Ahli.

He scored his first goal for Persepolis in August 2007 – a 37-yard free kick during a 2–0 win against Pegah F.C. He also scored the equalizer in the 7th week match against Pas Hamedan with a 25-yard volley.

He scored yet another 40-yard free kick against Sepahan, but it was not enough to prevent Persepolis suffering their first defeat of the season, losing 2–1. In all, he scored 7 goals for Persepolis. He signed a contract with Damash in June 2011.

International career
He gained his first international cap for Iran on August 16, 2000, in a friendly versus Georgia. His appearances for the national team have been few, including in October 2006 when he was called up to join Team Melli in an LG cup tournament held in Jordan. In June 2007 he had his fifth cap for Iran in a friendly against Mexico.

Honours

Iran's Premier Football League Winner: 2
2003/04 with Pas Tehran
2007/08 with Persepolis
Hazfi Cup Winner: 1
2006 with Sepahan

References

External links

Iranian footballers
Iran international footballers
Association football midfielders
Persian Gulf Pro League players
Azadegan League players
Tractor S.C. players
Pas players
Persepolis F.C. players
Sepahan S.C. footballers
Gostaresh Foulad F.C. players
Saipa F.C. players
Damash Gilan players
People from Sarab, East Azerbaijan
1977 births
Living people
21st-century Iranian people